The 2007 IAFL (Irish American Football League) season, with new divisional format, was due to begin on March 4 with the College Championship game between DCU Saints and UL Vikings, but the game was delayed due to rain, so the season proper began on March 25 when the Cork Admirals beat the Belfast Bulls, the UL Vikings beat the Tallaght Outlaws and Dublin Rebels beat the Dublin City University Saints. The season continued throughout April and May, with the IAFL College Championship Game eventually been rescheduled on June 3, with the UL Vikings beating the DCU Saints 50–2.

During the course of the regular season, two non-league games were played against foreign opposition, with CMS College Stags beating the Tallaght Outlaws 67–0 and, in the Claddagh Classic on June 2, the Team USA All-Stars beat the Carrickfergus Knights 26–0.

Note: W = Wins, L = Losses, T = Ties

Northern Division

Central Division

Southern Division

Playoffs 
The play-off positions were decided on the last day of the regular season, with the Belfast Bulls, Dublin Rebels and UL Vikings securing their respective Divisional titles and the Belfast Trojans and Cork Admirals as the wildcard teams. Cork Admirals won the wildcard game and set up a play-off tie with the Dublin Rebels, strongly fancied to retain the Shamrock Bowl for the 5th consecutive time. However, Cork managed to win a close fought 8-6 victory and secured their first ever bowl appearance against UL Vikings, who beat the Belfast Bulls 44-2 to set the stage for the first ever all-Munster Shamrock Bowl. The UL Vikings won a very close game 22-14 to win Shamrock Bowl XXI and claim their first ever title.

External links 
 

Irish American Football League
Iafl Season, 2007
2007 in Irish sport